Anthopleura is a genus of sea anemones, of the family Actiniidae.

Etymology 

Anthopleura is Greek; anthōs, flowers and pleura, ribs.

Species
According to the World Register of Marine Species, this genus includes:

References

Actiniidae
Hexacorallia genera